Frédéric Airault (born 18 May 1868 in Paris) was a French engineer and dirigible pilot who was technical director of a number of automobile and aviation firms before the First World War.

Biography

He enrolled at the École des Arts et Métiers campus in Angers from 1884 gaining his diplôme d'ingénieur in 1887. Airault served with the French Navy for five years, and in 1892 he joined the Société française de constructions mécaniques. In 1897, he designed a V-4 engine 24 hp engine with progressive friction transmission, and from 1899 he worked at the car and bicycle maker Hurtu as engineer, head of research and then Technical Director. He stayed there for four years, and in 1903 became a co-director of the Anciennes usines Buchet ('Former Buchet Factories') in Levallois-Perret, a north western Paris suburb. Élie Buchet, founder of the original 'Usines Buchet', had died in late 1903.

Airault left in 1905 to become general director of Fabbrica di Automobili Florentia. Airault stayed there for a year before moving to become Technical Director of the Société française des trains Renard in 1906. The Daimler Company manufactured the Road Train under licence in the UK.

The industrialist Henri Deutsch de la Meurthe joined with Édouard Surcouf to form Société Astra to make dirigible airships. Airault piloted the dirigible "Osmanli" (the first Turkish airship) at the Parc Saint-Cloud on 18 April 1909. Airault was the director of the aeronautic park for the Astra III dirigible Ville-de-Nancy (piloted by Édouard Surcouf and :fr:Henry Kapférer) at the Exposition Internationale de l'Est de la France in Nancy in 1909.

He became Technical Director of Compagnie générale transaérienne  (CGT) (later Air France), founded in October 1909 by Louis Blériot and again owned by Henri Deutsch de la Meurthe. He installed hydrogen gas plants at Nancy and then at Beauval for CGT.

While testing the Astra VI l'Espagne on 5 November 1909, the propeller shaft ruptured, breaking the nacelle. Airault avoided a catastrophe, landing with a masterly hand near Frémainville, Seine-et-Oise (now Val d'Oise), some 50 miles (85 km) from Meaux. Brought back to Beauval, repaired and modified, l’España was delivered to the Spanish military authorities at the start of 1910.

In August 1910, he received his pilot-aeronaut certificate for dirigible balloons (along with Robert Balny d'Avricourt.) Transaérienne started operating Astra dirigibles in France and Switzerland. Airault, as the company's chief pilot, directed operations of Surcouf's Astra VII Ville de Lucerne in August 1910 in Lucerne. Transaérienne followed this with a seaplane service on Lake Lucerne and Lake Geneva, then cross-channel flights in 1911. Henri de la Meurthe also bought the Nieuport aircraft firm after Edouard Nieuport died in a flying accident in 1911.

In 1912, he lived at 25, Rue de Marignan, Paris.

References
Notes

Citations

Sources

External links
Contemporary advertisements for Hurtu and Buchet products
Photo of Airault's wife and Mme Clauzel in the nacelle of Stella.  Concours du Grand Prix de L'Aero-Club de France, Esplanade des Invalides, Paris, 26 September 1909. 
 Photo of Astra VI dirigible España, with Kapférer, Airault, and Henri Deutsch de la Meurthe. Retrieved 22 March 2016

1868 births
19th-century French engineers
Year of death missing
20th-century French engineers